Vladimir Vladimirovich Petrov (30 June 1947 – 28 February 2017) was a Russian Soviet ice hockey player, Olympic Champion (1972, 1976) and silver medalist (1980).

Born in Krasnogorsk, Soviet Union, Vladimir Petrov played in Soviet Ice Hockey League for Krylya Sovetov, Moscow (from 1965 to 1967), CSKA Moscow (from 1967 to 1981) and SKA, Leningrad (from 1981 to 1983). In CSKA Moscow and Soviet national team, he, together with Boris Mikhailov and Valeri Kharlamov, formed one of the best offensive lines ever.

Petrov played for the Soviet Team in three Winter Olympics, 1972 Soviet Union-Canada Summit Series and many IIHF World Championships. He is 4th all-time leading scorer in World Championships, with 154 points (74 goals and 80 assists) in 102 games and scored 7 points (3 goals and 4 assists) in 8 games of Summit Series. He retired from ice hockey in 1983.

In mid-1990s, Petrov was the president of Russian Ice Hockey Federation. In 2006, Petrov was enshrined to the IIHF Hall of Fame. He was buried in the Federal Military Memorial Cemetery in Moscow Oblast.

Awards
 1973, 1975, 1977, 1979 – World Championships All-Star
 1973, 1975, 1977, 1979 – World Championships leading scorer
 1972, 1973 – Soviet League Player of the Year
 1973, 1975, 1977, 1979 – Soviet League All-Star
 1970, 1973, 1975, 1978, 1979 – Soviet League leading scorer
 Order For Merit to the Fatherland 4th class
 Order of Friendship
 2 Orders of the Badge of Honour
 2 Medals "For Labour Valour"

Career statistics

Regular season

International

External links
 
 Vladimir Petrov biography

1947 births
2017 deaths
Burials at the Federal Military Memorial Cemetery
HC CSKA Moscow players
Ice hockey players at the 1972 Winter Olympics
Ice hockey players at the 1976 Winter Olympics
Ice hockey players at the 1980 Winter Olympics
IIHF Hall of Fame inductees
Krylya Sovetov Moscow players
Medalists at the 1972 Winter Olympics
Medalists at the 1976 Winter Olympics
Medalists at the 1980 Winter Olympics
Olympic ice hockey players of the Soviet Union
Olympic gold medalists for the Soviet Union
Olympic medalists in ice hockey
Olympic silver medalists for the Soviet Union
People from Krasnogorsk, Moscow Oblast
SKA Saint Petersburg players
Soviet ice hockey centres
Sportspeople from Moscow Oblast